Busan University of Foreign Studies, often shortened to  부산외대 and BUFS, romanized as Pusan University of Foreign Studies before 2011, is a private university in Busan, South Korea, which specializes in foreign languages. 
In 2014, following the completion of a new campus on the slope of Mount Geumjeongsan, the university  moved to Namsan-dong.

History
Busan University of Foreign Studies was founded in 1981 by the late Chung Tae-sung. His philosophy for education was that young intellectual minds must become leaders internationally. Busan University of Foreign Studies was founded as a college for studying foreign languages in April 1982 with its first students studying English, French, Japanese, Chinese, German, Indonesian, Malay, and Thai. Through the 1980s, the college expanded its programs and finally became a university in 1991. , Busan University of Foreign Studies has academic exchange program agreements with 94 universities in 24 countries.

Courses
BUFS consists of seven colleges, four graduate school programs, and nine research institutes. The language portion of the school is structured in three of the colleges: College of English,  Japanese, and  Chinese, College of Occidental Studies, and College of Oriental Studies. Other Western languages that the university offers are Italian, Spanish, Portuguese, and Russian. Eastern languages in addition to Japanese and Chinese include Vietnamese, Burmese, Hindi, Arabic, Turkish, and Uzbek.

The university also provides programs of study in international studies, Korean as a foreign language and literature, international law, international business, and IT.

Colleges

In early 2020 soon after the admission of that year's freshmen, the school administration announced a significant change in the number of admission in multiple departments. This included the entire cease in the admission of some majors such as the Department of Paideia for Creative Leadership (which had had one of the highest levels of competition and had been considered the most valuable major), effectively closing down those majors. New majors were created in their places such as the Department of Counseling Psychology and the Department of Airline Service Management.  

Soon after the announcement, the school administration received major backlash from multiple student bodies, and a conference took place between heads of school administrative departments and members of the student councils. The major point of complaint from the students was that the announcement was given without any warning, leaving the freshmen feeling as though they were tricked into entering a university where their major wouldn't exist straight after graduation. Despite the students' questions about the ethics of the university's conduct, the conference ended with the university administrators insisting on financial inviability and population decline to justify their decisions(The point of population decline was quickly pointed out by one of the students as being deceptive due to the total number of students remaining the same in the university's plans). This major shift in the structure of the BUFS curriculum reaffirmed a preexisting negative notion of apathy of the university administration for student welfare and furthered the criticism that the university is in the process of losing its identity of specializing in languages and foreign studies by prioritizing trend and profit.

 College of English, Chinese and Japanese Studies
 Division of English
 Major in English for Tourism and Convention
 Major in English for Communication, Interpretation and Translation
 Major in British & American Literature and Culture Contents
 Major in English for IT
 Division of Japanese Communication
 Major in Japanese Interpretation and Translation
 Major in Japanese Language and Literature
 Division of Japanese Business
 Major in Japanese in Hotel and Tourism
 Major in Japanese in Business and IT
 Division of Chinese
 Major in Chinese Interpretation and Translation
 Major in Chinese Language and Culture
 College of Occidental Studies
 Department of French
 Department of German
 Department of Spanish
 Department of Portuguese
 Department of Russian
 Department of Italian
 Department of Commercial Relations in the EU
 College of Oriental Studies
 Department of Thai
 Department of Indonesia-Malaysia
 Department of Arabic
 Department of India
 Department of Vietnamese
 Department of Myanmar
 Department of Turkish and Central Asian Languages (Kazakh, Uzbek)
 Department of Commercial Relations in China
 College of Humanities and Social Sciences
 Department of Paideia for Creative Leadership (Liberal Arts/ Global Dual Degree Program) (Stopped admission since 2020)
 Division of Korean Language & Literature
 Major in Korean Literature
 Major in Korean Education as a Foreign Language
 Major in Korean Language and Literature for Foreigners
 Department of Visual Media
 Department of History and Tourism
 Division of Law and Police
 Major in Law
 Major in Police
 Department of International Relations
 Department of Social Welfare
 College of Commerce
 Division of Business Administration
 Major in International Management
 Major in Service Management
 Department of International Trade
 Department of Data management
 Division of Accounting and Taxation
 Major in Accounting and Money Business
 Major in Taxation
 Department of Economics
 Department of e-Business
 Department of International Secretarial [Administrative] Studies
 Division of Russian & Indian Business Studies
 Major in Russian Business and Area Studies
 Major in Indian Business and Area Studies
 College of Natural Science
 Department of Information Mathematics
 Department of Computer Engineering
 Division of Digital Media Engineering
 Major in Multi-Media
 Major in Information Communication
 Department of Embedded IT
 Division of Sports and Leisure Studies
 Major in Sport for All
 Major in Sport Management
 Major in Golf

Notable people
 Usun Yoon, actress

Accident

References

External links
 

Universities and colleges in Busan
Educational institutions established in 1981
1981 establishments in South Korea